An AgustaWestland AW169 helicopter crashed shortly after take-off from King Power Stadium, home ground of Leicester City F.C. in Leicester, England, while on route to Luton Airport on 27 October 2018. All people on board – the pilot and four passengers, including club owner Vichai Srivaddhanaprabha – were killed in the crash.
The Air Accidents Investigation Branch attributed the crash to a loss of yaw control owing to a failure of the tail rotor control linkage.

History of the flight
Vichai frequently travelled to and from Leicester City's matches at the King Power Stadium in the helicopter, with the Leicester Mercury describing it as "a familiar sight for Foxes fans." On 27 October, the helicopter departed Fairoaks Airport in Surrey with the pilot and his girlfriend on board. It stopped at London Heliport to collect three additional passengers – Srivaddhanaprabha and two members of his staff – before departing at 14:43 BST (13:43 UTC). All on board disembarked and traveled by car to the stadium for Leicester's game against West Ham United. The pilot and his girlfriend returned after the football match concluded and then, as was usual, flew the helicopter to the stadium to collect Srivaddhanaprabha and his two staff members. The helicopter was seen preparing to lift off from the pitch live on BT Sport, during a post-match broadcast. By this point, the coach carrying the West Ham team had departed, but some Leicester City staff and players were still in the stadium, while there remained fans of both clubs in areas outside.

The aircraft was due to fly to Luton Airport.

Accident

With Vichai, the pilot and three other people on board, the helicopter took off from within the stadium at approximately 20:37 BST (19:37 UTC). As the pilot turned the helicopter towards its en-route heading, the tail rotor control linkage broke, sending the helicopter into an uncontrollable spin. One witness described the aircraft falling "like a stone to the floor". Two police officers and club staff leaving the stadium attempted to rescue those in the helicopter but had to retreat due to the heat and flames. Investigators ruled out a suggestion of a collision with a police drone as a possible cause.

The following day, Leicestershire Police confirmed that everybody on board had been killed in the crash and subsequent fire, and named the five fatalities. They were three Thais: club owner Vichai Srivaddhanaprabha and two members of his staff – Kaveporn Punpare and Nusara Suknamai, British pilot Eric Swaffer, and his Polish girlfriend, Izabela Roza Lechowicz. A small memorial has been erected at East Sheen Cemetery for these two pilots. There were no casualties elsewhere.

Two police officers, Michael Hooper and Stephen Quartermain, suffered burns and smoke inhalation attempting to rescue the occupants, and subsequently were nominated for a national police bravery award as well as receiving Queen's Gallantry Medals.

Aircraft
The aircraft involved in the accident was an AgustaWestland AW169 helicopter, registration G-VSKP, c/n 69018, manufactured in 2016. It was powered by two Pratt & Whitney Canada PW210A engines. The aircraft was owned by Foxborough and operated by Amadeus Aviation. This was the first crash and hull loss involving the AW169.

Investigation
The Air Accidents Investigation Branch (AAIB) opened an investigation into the accident. Italy's Agenzia Nazionale per la Sicurezza del Volo, representing the state of the manufacturer of the helicopter, and Canada's Transportation Safety Board, representing the state of the manufacturer of the helicopter's engines, provided assistance. Accredited representatives from Poland's State Commission on Aircraft Accidents Investigation and Thailand's Aircraft Accident Investigation Committee also provided assistance. The aircraft's Digital Flight Data Recorder was recovered on 28 October, having been severely damaged in the fire. It was transported to the AAIB's base at Farnborough, Hampshire, for downloading of data contained therein. The wreckage of the helicopter was transported to Farnborough on 2 November.

A coroner's inquest was convened to investigate the official cause of death for the passengers and crew of the helicopter. The investigation reported in the court revealed that there was minimal opportunity for any individuals who survived the initial crash to escape, or anyone to help those trapped.

On 7 November, the European Aviation Safety Agency (EASA) issued an Airworthiness Directive, demanding checks of the tails of all AgustaWestland AW169  and AgustaWestland AW189 helicopters, as a precautionary measure. On 14 November, the AAIB released a Special Bulletin, outlining the progress of the investigation. A loss of yaw control was revealed as the cause of the aircraft crashing, with the reasons for the loss of yaw control not yet determined. On 30 November, the EASA issued an Emergency Alert Service Bulletin requiring periodic inspection of part of the tail rotor system. This was made mandatory by an Airworthiness Directive issued the same day.

On 6 December 2018, the AAIB published a second Special Bulletin. Investigators revealed that loss of control of the helicopter resulted from the tail rotor actuator control shaft (which controls the pitch of the tail rotor blades) becoming disconnected from the actuator lever mechanism that transmits the pilots' pedal inputs to control the helicopter's yaw. They have also revealed evidence of the normally stationary control shaft being spun by the tail rotor which caused the castellated nut holding the actuator lever in place to friction weld to its carrier, shear off its split pin and rotate off the threaded shaft. The locking nut and pin carrier were found loose in the tail rotor fairing and were bonded together. A duplex bearing that was designed to allow the control shaft to remain stationary (with the rest of the tail rotor assembly rotating around it) was found to only allow a few degrees of rotation, with the races blocked up by a mix of burnt grease and metallic particles. AAIB Chief Inspector Crispin Orr stated on the third anniversary 27 October 2021 that the complex investigation is continuing and a final report will be published when their work is complete.

Responses

Fans began to lay flowers and football shirts outside the ground the next morning. Shirts and scarves were also seen from other teams including West Ham United, Leicester City's opponent in the match prior to the crash. On 30 October, Leicester City opened a book of condolence, with an online version also available. In the immediate aftermath of the accident, some buildings were floodlit in blue as a tribute to the victims, including England's national stadium, Wembley.

The Leicester City Foxes Foundation Charity was renamed The Vichai Srivaddhanaprabha Foundation in honour of the deceased chairman and owner.

On 10 November Leicester City fans took part in a '5,000-1' walk in united remembrance of the helicopter crash victims. Thousands of fans took part in the memorial walk before Leicester City played Burnley at home. The initial appeal was for 5,000 fans to take part, though reports suggested the number was about 10,000.

Leicester City established a memorial garden on the site of the crash.

Football 
The 2018–19 FA Women's Championship match between Leicester City and Manchester United, scheduled for the day after the crash, was postponed out of respect for the victims.
The women's reserve league match against Derby County was also postponed. Leicester City's 2018–19 EFL Cup fixture against Southampton, which had been scheduled to take place at the King Power Stadium on 30 October 2018, and the 2018–19 Premier League International Cup fixture between Leicester City U-23s and Feyenoord Academy, were also subsequently postponed. The 2018–19 Belgian First Division B fixture between Oud-Heverlee Leuven, the second club owned by Vichai Srivaddhanaprabha, and Lommel, originally scheduled for 31 October, was also postponed.

At the other Premier League football fixtures on Sunday, players wore black armbands, both for the crash victims and for Remembrance Day, though a few days earlier than Remembrance armbands are usually worn.

The NFL London series match between the Philadelphia Eagles and Jacksonville Jaguars taking place at Wembley stadium the next day included a pre-game tribute in memory of both the Leicester crash and the Pittsburgh synagogue shooting which occurred on the same day.

Litigation
On 26 October 2021, the families of the pilots launched a legal case at the District Court of Massachusetts in the United States, suing Raytheon for damages. The plaintiffs allege that Raytheon "negligently designed, manufactured, assembled and sold the Tail Rotor Actuator such that the Accident Aircraft's Tail Rotor Actuator control shaft was subject to disconnection from the actuator lever mechanism".

See also
Matthew Harding – Chelsea F.C. investor killed in a helicopter crash returning from a football match in October 1996.

References

2018 disasters in the United Kingdom
2018 in England
October 2018 events in the United Kingdom
2010s in Leicester
Accidents and incidents involving the AgustaWestland AW169
Aviation accidents and incidents in 2018
Aviation accidents and incidents in England
Sports-related aviation accidents and incidents
Leicester City F.C.
Oud-Heverlee Leuven